The Recognition of EMS Personnel Licensure Interstate CompAct, also known as "REPLICA", is an interstate compact that extends a "privilege to practice" in the United States from a 'home state' to 'remote states' for qualified Emergency Medical Services personnel. For a state to participate in the compact, a state must pass the model legislation into law.  On October 11, 2017, when Georgia signed the REPLICA legislation into law, the EMS Compact was formalized and the Interstate Commission for EMS Personnel Practice was established.

Participating states 
 Colorado
 Texas
 Virginia
 Idaho
 Utah
 Kansas
 Tennessee
 Wyoming
 Georgia
 Alabama
 Delaware
 Iowa
 Mississippi
 Missouri
 Nebraska
 South Dakota
North Dakota 
 South Carolina 
 West Virginia 
 Indiana

Requirements

For states
 Pass the REPLICA model legislation
 Utilize the National Registry of EMTs (NREMT) examination as a condition of issuing initial licenses at the EMT and Paramedic levels
 Within five years of passing the legislation, utilize a fingerprint or biometric background check that is compliant with the FBI requirement

For personnel
A qualified EMS personnel must:
 Be licensed in good standing in a home state as an Emergency Medical Technician (EMT), Advanced EMT (AEMT), a Paramedic, or a level in between EMT and Paramedic
 Must be at least 18 years of age
 Must practice under the supervision of a physician medical director

History

Early history 
In 2012, EMS leaders recognized the need for qualified EMS personnel to respond across state lines in both day-to-day duties, in non-Governor level declared disaster situations, and planned large-scale events, and the requirement for state EMS licensing authorities to better share licensure information. In 2013 a National Advisory Panel held multiple meetings conceptualize the solution.

On the recommendation of the National Advisory Panel, a draft team was formed in mid-2013 to draft the model legislation. The twelve member drafting team included:
 Five members from National Association of State EMS Officials (NASEMSO)
 The Council of State Government, (CSG) National Center for Interstate Compacts (NCIC)
 Association of Air Medical Services (AAMS)
 International Association of Flight and Critical Care Paramedics (IAFCC)
 International Association of Firefighters  (IAFF)
 National EMS Management Association (NEMSA)
 National Association of EMT’s (NAEMT)
 Vedder Price (legal counsel)
On 7 September 2017, the National EMS Advisory Council passed a Final Advisory in support of the Recognition of Emergency Medical Services Personnel Licensure Interstate CompAct.

Early Activation 
The EMS Personnel Licensure Compact was originally scheduled to become active on July 1, 2020. However, with so many emergency services personnel taken out of action by quarantines associated with the COVID-19 outbreak, the decision was made to go live on March 16, 2020. Interstate Commission Chairman Joe Schmider reported that this type of emergency was what the EMS Compact was developed to accommodate.

Supporting associations and organizations 
 American Ambulance Association
 Association of Air Medical Services
 Association of Critical Care Transport
 Council Of State Governments
 International Association of Fire Chiefs
 National Association of EMS Educators
 National Association of EMS Physicians
 National Association of Emergency Medical Technicians
 National Association of State EMS Officials
 National EMS Management Association
 National Registry of Emergency Medical Technicians
 National Volunteer Fire Council

Citations and external links 

United States interstate compacts
Emergency medical services in the United States
Colorado law
Texas law
Virginia law
Idaho law
Utah law
Kansas law
Tennessee law
Wyoming law
 West Virginia law